La Roquebrussanne is a commune in the Var department in the Provence-Alpes-Côte d'Azur region in southeastern France. The French educator and writer Louis-François Jauffret (1770–1840) was born in the village.

See also
Communes of the Var department

References

Communes of Var (department)